Secret Love, alsp known as The Secret River, is a 2010 [South Korean erotic thriller film starring Yoo Ji-tae and Yoon Jin-seo

Plot
Only two months after their storybook marriage, beautiful young Yeon-yi (Yoon Jin-seo) is suffering through the repercussions of a car crash that's put her handsome new husband Jin-woo (Yoo Ji-tae) into a deep coma. She finds herself waiting at the airport for her husband's brother Jin-ho, but, never having previously met, Yeon-yi is shocked to discover that he and Jin-woo are identical twins. Initially cold toward each other, the two soon fall in love. The situation grows more complicated when Jin-woo suddenly awakens from his coma.

Cast
Yoo Ji-tae as Jin-woo / Jin-ho
Yoon Jin-seo as Yeon-yi
Im Ye-jin as Yeon-yi's mother
Oh Yeon-ah as strange woman
Jung In-gi as Priest Choi
Ko Yu-seon as Nurse Kim
Lee Mi-do as Nurse Park
Lee -rin as Nurse Lee
Seo Jin as Ate Amy Cute
Yang Eun-yong as editor-in-chief
Im Ho as hair stylist
Ji Dae-han as hiker
Sung Ji-ru as inn owner
 Lee Jun-hyeok as unfamiliar man

Production
Bimilae has also been referred to as The Secret River.

Stars Yoo Ji-tae and Yoon Jin-seo previously worked together in Oldboy.

References

External links
 
 
 

2010 films
2010s erotic thriller films
2010s romantic thriller films
Erotic romance films
Films shot in Incheon
2010s Korean-language films
South Korean erotic thriller films
South Korean romantic thriller films
2010s South Korean films